Donation is an unincorporated community in Huntingdon County, Pennsylvania, United States.

History
A post office called Donation was established in 1856, and remained in operation until 1905. The origin of the name "Donation" is obscure.

References

Unincorporated communities in Huntingdon County, Pennsylvania
Unincorporated communities in Pennsylvania